Ksar Hellal is a town and commune in the Monastir Governorate, Tunisia.
As of 2014 it had a population of 49,376.

Notable people
 Houcine Dimassi, the Minister of Finance, Under Prime Minister Hamadi Jebali
 Ons Jabeur, professional tennis player
 Nejib Ayed, film producer
 Haj Ali Soua, a Tunisian trader and philanthropist
 Amor Rourou, Politician
 Abdelfattah Boussetta, a Tunisian Sculptor and visual artist
 M'hamed Hassine Fantar, a Tunisian author and historian

See also
List of cities in Tunisia
Evolution of Textile Monument (Ksar Hellal)

References

External links

Populated places in Monastir Governorate
Communes of Tunisia